The Nova Scotia Junior Hockey League (formerly the Nova Scotia Junior B Hockey League) is a Junior "B" ice hockey league in Nova Scotia, Canada, sanctioned by Hockey Canada.  The winner of the Nova Scotia playoffs competes for the Don Johnson Cup, the Atlantic Junior "B" Crown.

History
The Mainland Junior B Hockey League was formed in 1980 by Al Hollingsworth.  In 1992, it took on the Cape Breton Jr. Mills and the Port Hawkesbury Pirates of the folded Cape Breton Junior B Hockey League (also known as the Eastern or Northumberland League) and was renamed the Nova Scotia Junior B Hockey League.  In 2006, the league dropped the "B" from its name.

Teams

Defunct
Bay Ducks (2005–14) - moved to Liverpool 
Bedford Barons  (1980–82)
Bedford Barons  (1994–95)
Bridgewater Hawks  (1980–81)
Chester Ravens (1993-2002)
Colchester County K&K Truck Centre Titans (1995–96) - moved to Brookfield 
Colchester County Sports Eagle Experts (1996–97) - renamed Brookfield Elks
East Hants Penguins (1984–90)
Eastern Shore Jr. Mariners (2011–14) - moved to Cole Harbour
Halifax Molson Canadian Blues (1995–96)
Mount Denson Rangers (1993–97)
Oxford Blues (2000–03)
Shannon Huskies (1980–84)
South Shore Flyers (1980–82)
Springhill Premium Moosehead Dry  (1992–93)
Springhill Ropak Rangers (1991–92)
Spryfield Lions  (1980–84)
St. Margaret's Mariners  (1988–92)
Truro Bearcats (1983–91)
Valley Jets (1980–84)
West Colchester Titans (1982–83)
Windsor Royals (1984-2012)

Playoff Champions
Bolded are teams who also won the Don Johnson Cup as Atlantic Jr. B Champions.

See also
List of ice hockey teams in Nova Scotia

External links
Nova Scotia Jr. "B"

Ice hockey leagues in Nova Scotia
B